Prince Ranjitsinhji Practising Batting in the Nets was a 1897 film of the cricketer Ranjitsinhji.

This film attributed to Henry Walter Barnett, is one of the earliest surviving about cricket.

References

External links

1890s Australian films
1890s short documentary films
Films set in 1897
Australian sports documentary films
Australian silent short films
Australian black-and-white films
1897 short films
Cricket films